Harry Giese (2 March 1903 – 20 January 1991) was a German theatre and voice actor born in Magdeburg, Province of Saxony. He is best known for providing voiceovers on German newsreels during the Second World War especially Die Deutsche Wochenschau which was shown weekly in cinemas. The newsreel presented the latest news from war time fronts using film from cameramen working with the Wehrmacht. Giese provided the voice-overs for Ufa Tonwoche and Die Deutsche Wochenschau from October 1939 to the end of the Second World War.

During the war Harry Giese was known as the "Großdeutscher Sprecher", or "Greater German Spokesperson".

The Eternal Jew
He was  the narrator of the anti-Semitic propaganda film The Eternal Jew (1940). The documentary was a product of the Ministry of Propaganda under Joseph Goebbels, who committed suicide in the bunker under the Reich Chancellery on 1 May 1945, shortly after the suicide of Adolf Hitler.

References

External links
 

1903 births
1991 deaths
Actors from Magdeburg
People from the Province of Saxony
German male film actors
German male stage actors
German male voice actors
20th-century German male actors
Nazi propagandists